Winterhalter is a surname. Notable people with the surname include:

 Albert G. Winterhalter (1856–1920), admiral in the United States Navy, commander in chief of the U.S. Asiatic Fleet from 1915 to 1917
 Franz Xaver Winterhalter (1805–1873), German painter and lithographer
 Hermann Winterhalter (1808–1891), German painter, brother of Franz
 Hugo Winterhalter (1909–1973), American arranger and composer

See also
Winterhalder